The Tupolev MTB-1 (known originally as the MDR-4 and internally to Tupolev as the ANT-27) was a patrol flying boat built in the Soviet Union in the mid-1930s. It was a refined version of the unsuccessful Chyetverikov MDR-3. The revised design retained the MDR-3's hull, but added a newly designed, full-cantilever wing, a new tail, and a new engine installation featuring two tractor and one pusher unit. Trials began in March 1934 but the prototype was destroyed during one takeoff.

A second prototype was constructed the following year, and redesignated MTB-1 to reflect a new torpedo-carrying role. Despite its poor performance in trials, the aircraft was urgently needed to fill a niche in the Soviet Navy, and it was accepted for production before flight testing was complete. Despite some early structural failures, 15 of these machines were eventually produced and saw service in the Navy for several years, remaining in service until 1942.

Operators
 
 Soviet Naval Aviation

Specifications (MTB-1)

Notes

Bibliography

Further reading
 
 

1930s Soviet patrol aircraft
Flying boats
Three-engined push-pull aircraft
High-wing aircraft
Aircraft first flown in 1934